Christian of Hessen-Darmstadt (25 November 1763, Bouxwiller – 17 April 1830, Darmstadt) was landgraf of the house of Hesse-Darmstadt and a Dutch general. He was also a keen Freemason, rising to grandmaster.

Life
The youngest son of landgraf Louis IX and his wife Caroline, one of his brothers was grand-duke Louis I. Landgraf Christian studied in Strasbourg and then chose a military career in the service of the Dutch Republic. As lieutenant-general he fought for William V against the French from 1793 to 1794 and was badly wounded in the siege of Menen in April 1794. After the Dutch were defeated in 1795 he went into exile in England and later continued the war against France in the Austrian army. From 1799 he lived in Darmstadt, and is buried in the Alten Friedhof there.

Ancestry

References

External links
 

1763 births
1830 deaths
House of Hesse-Darmstadt
People from Haut-Rhin
Members of the First Chamber of the Estates of the Grand Duchy of Hesse
Knights Grand Cross of the Military Order of William
Landgraves of Hesse-Darmstadt
Dutch military personnel of the French Revolutionary Wars
Sons of monarchs